Carp is an unincorporated community in the northeastern part of Montgomery Township, Owen County, in the U.S. state of Indiana. It lies near the intersection of US Highway 231 and County Road 50 East (a.k.a. Rocky Hill Road), which is a community nearly eight miles north of the city of Spencer, the county seat of Owen County.  Its elevation is 722 feet (220 m), and it is located at  (39.3850457, -86.7608397).

History
A post office was established at Carp in 1885, and remained in operation until it was discontinued in 1904.

Geography
Smith Cemetery is about three miles directly west of this community, and it is located on County Road 200 West at  (39.3911563 -86.8052853).

Amazon Lake is about three miles south of this community, which is west of the intersection of US Highway 231 and Indiana Highway 67 at  (39.3544016 -86.7474351).

School districts
 Spencer-Owen Community Schools, including a high school.

Political districts
 State House District 46
 State Senate District 39

References

External links
 Roadside Thoughts for Carp, Indiana

Unincorporated communities in Owen County, Indiana
Unincorporated communities in Indiana